Muamer Adžem (born 1 November 1992) is a Bosnian professional footballer who plays as a centre-back.

Club career
Adžem started off his career at hometown club Goražde for who he played from 2012 to 2015, before signing for German low tier club Hepberg.

After one year in Germany, Adžem came back to Bosnia and Herzegovina and returned to Goražde where he stayed for one season. In 2017, he joined First League of FBiH club Zvijezda Gradačac for who he was a regular for the whole 2017–18 First League of FBiH season.

In June 2018, Adžem signed with Bosnian Premier League club Sloboda Tuzla. He made his debut for Sloboda on 5 August 2018, in a 0–1 home league loss against Sarajevo, coming in as a 57th minute substitute for Omar Pršeš and was a first team regular at the club. He left Sloboda after his contract with the club expired with the end of the 2018–19 season.

In August 2019, Adžem came back for a second time and signed a contract with Goražde. He played his first match since his return to Goražde on 10 August 2019, in a 2–1 home league win against Metalleghe-BSI.

In January 2020, Adžem left Goražde again, this time joining Olimpik. He made his official debut for Olimpik on 4 March 2020, in a quarter-finals game of the 2019–20 Bosnian Cup against Široki Brijeg in which Olimpik drew 1–1, but later lost in a penalty shootout. On 26 May 2020, the 2019–20 First League of FBiH season ended abruptly due to the ongoing COVID-19 pandemic in Bosnia and Herzegovina and, by default, Adžem with Olimpik were crowned league champions and got promoted back to the Bosnian Premier League. On 7 July 2020, he extended his contract with Olimpik. Adžem scored his first goal for Olimpik in a league game against Velež Mostar on 12 September 2020. He unexpectedly left the club on 2 October 2020.

Career statistics

Club

Honours
Goražde
Second League of FBiH: 2013–14 (Center)

Olimpik
First League of FBiH: 2019–20

References

External links
Muamer Adžem at Sofascore

1992 births
Living people
People from Goražde
Association football central defenders
Bosnia and Herzegovina footballers
FK Goražde players
NK Zvijezda Gradačac players
FK Sloboda Tuzla players
FK Olimpik players
First League of the Federation of Bosnia and Herzegovina players
Premier League of Bosnia and Herzegovina players
Bosnia and Herzegovina expatriate footballers
Expatriate footballers in Germany
Bosnia and Herzegovina expatriate sportspeople in Germany